Hasnabad is a village and a gram panchayat in the Hasnabad CD block in the Basirhat subdivision of the North 24 Parganas district in the state of West Bengal, India.Hasnabad is called the' Second Gateway of Sunderban'.

Geography

Location

The Ichhamati, the second most important river in the district after the Hooghly "flows south easterly meandering course over C.D. Blocks like Bagda, Bongaon and Basirhat-I and Basirhat-II and thus forms the international boundary with Bangladesh." It finally meets the Raimangal further south.

Area overview
The area shown in the map is a part of the Ichhamati-Raimangal Plain, located in the lower Ganges Delta. It contains soil of mature black or brownish loam to recent alluvium. Numerous rivers, creeks and khals criss-cross the area. The tip of the Sundarbans National Park is visible in the lower part of the map (shown in green but not marked). The larger full screen map shows the full forest area. A large section of the area is a part of the Sundarbans settlements. The densely populated area is an overwhelmingly rural area. Only 12.96% of the population lives in the urban areas and 87.04% of the population lives in the rural areas.

Note: The map alongside presents some of the notable locations in the subdivision. All places marked in the map are linked in the larger full screen map.

Civic administration

Police station
Hasnabad police station covers an area of 295 km2 and serves a population of 218,520. It has jurisdiction over Taki municipality and Hasnabad CD block. There is a town out-post at Rajbari. It has a riverine border of 28 km, out of which 27 km is unfenced.

CD block HQ
The headquarters of Hasnabad CD block are located at Hasnabasd village.

Demographics

Population
According to the 2011 Census of India, Hasnabad had a total population of 3,412, of which 1.863 (55%) were males and 1,549 (45%) were females. Population in the age rage 0–6 years was 320. The total number of literate persons in Hasnabad was 2,642 (85.45% of the population over 6 years).

Transport
Hasnabad railway station is the terminus of the Barasat-Hasnabad line, which is part the Kolkata Suburban Railway railway system.

State Highway 2 passes through Hasnabad.

The 684 m long bridge across the Katakhali at Hasnabad was opened to public in March 2019, linking Hingalganj with Hasnabad. Lebukhali, the last point up to which motorised transport (except 2 wheeler) can reach is now directly connected to Kolkata and other places.

Education
Taki Government College at Taki is located nearby.

Healthcare
Hasnabad Matri Sadan with 6 beds is located at Hasnabad.

References

External links

Villages in North 24 Parganas district